Hwang Hak-Sun (born October 10, 1976) is a North Korean football player.

Club statistics

References

External links

1976 births
Living people
Association football people from Saitama Prefecture
North Korean footballers
J2 League players
Japan Football League players
Mito HollyHock players
Kataller Toyama players
Association football midfielders